The Jessica Simpson Collection is a fashion line of clothing and other items for women and juniors. Besides clothing, the brand also includes accessories, shoes, perfume and luggage. The brand initially launched in 2005 as a shoe collaboration with Nine West co-founder Vince Camuto. Due to the success that followed, Simpson began adding on, which resulted in the brand's current 22 different licenses.

As of December 2010, the brand is carried in 650 department stores across the United States, including upscale Lord & Taylor and Belk as well as Macy's and Dillard's. The collection earned $750 million in 2010, making it the top selling celebrity clothing empire. Simpson told New York magazine in February 2011, the reason her brand is so successful is because "When it comes to other celebrity brands, I think a lot of people do a great job, but it can't be all about them. Everybody doesn't want to just look like the celebrity, because they can't. They just want one element of that style." In 2015, the brand reached annual sales of $1 billion.

On August 31, 2021, Jessica Simpson's parent company, Sequential Brands, filed for Chapter 11 bankruptcy protection.

References

External links
Jessica Simpson Collection Official Website

Clothing brands of the United States
2000s fashion
2010s fashion
American companies established in 2005
Clothing companies established in 2005
Companies that filed for Chapter 11 bankruptcy in 2021
Companies based in Los Angeles
Jessica Simpson